Llewellyn James Owens (26 September 1927 – 1 January 2018) was an Australian rules footballer who played with Fitzroy and South Melbourne in the Victorian Football League (VFL).

Notes

External links 

Llew Owens's playing statistics from The VFA Project

2018 deaths
1927 births
Australian rules footballers from Victoria (Australia)
Fitzroy Football Club players
Sydney Swans players
Port Melbourne Football Club players